Dorothy Adams (January 8, 1900 – March 16, 1988) was an American character actress of stage, film, and television.

Early years
Adams was born in Hannah, North Dakota. She later moved to Vancouver, British Columbia, and was educated there.

Stage
In the 1920s, Adams was active with the Moroni Olsen Players.

Films and television

Adams was perhaps best known for her role as Wilma Cameron's mother in The Best Years of Our Lives (1946).

Adams made numerous television appearances in the 1950s. She was seen in Gunsmoke with James Arness, and four episodes of the Western series The Adventures of Kit Carson, starring Bill Williams. She appeared in four episodes of the crime drama series Dragnet, starring Jack Webb. She made two guest appearances in Perry Mason, starring Raymond Burr. She also appeared in comedy series, such as a 1958 episode of Leave it to Beaver, starring Jerry Mathers.

Later years
In the 1960s, she was a popular acting instructor at the UCLA School of Theater, Film and Television.

Personal life
Adams was married to character actor Byron Foulger from 1921 until his death in 1970. She was the mother of soap opera actress Rachel Ames.

Death
She died in 1988 in Woodland Hills, California. Her ashes lie with those of her husband in niche A142 in the Del Prado Mausoleum of Inglewood Park Cemetery in California.

Partial filmography

1938: Condemned Women as Nurse (uncredited)
1938: Crime Ring as Second Fortune Teller (uncredited)
1938: Broadway Musketeers as Anna, Judy's Governess
1939: Calling Dr. Kildare as Jenny's Mother (uncredited)
1939: Bachelor Mother as Secretary (uncredited)
1939: Mickey the Kid as Student's Mother (uncredited)
1939: On Borrowed Time as Florist (uncredited)
1939: Career as Telephone Operator (uncredited)
1939: The Women as Miss Atkinson (uncredited)
1939: Disputed Passage as Nurse (uncredited)
1939: Ninotchka as Jacqueline - Swana's Maid (uncredited)
1939: A Child Is Born as Nurse (uncredited)
1940: The Fight for Life as The Young Woman
1940: Babies for Sale as Mother in Dr. Gaines' Office (uncredited)
1940: Untamed as 3rd Nurse
1940: Cross-Country Romance as Emmy (uncredited)
1940: We Who Are Young as Bellevue Hospital Nurse (uncredited)
1940: Dr. Christian Meets the Women as Indigent Woman (uncredited)
1940: Lucky Partners as Maid at Ethel's (uncredited)
1940: Nobody's Children as Mrs. Alice Stone (uncredited)
1941: The Devil Commands as Mrs. Marcy
1941: Back Street as Mrs. Brown (uncredited)
1941: Tobacco Road as Payne's Secretary (uncredited)
1941: Penny Serenade as Mother in Stalled Car (uncredited)
1941: The Flame of New Orleans as Cousin
1941: Affectionately Yours as Reception Nurse at Hospital (uncredited)
1941: The Shepherd of the Hills as Elvy
1941: Highway West as Wife (uncredited)
1941: Whistling in the Dark as Mrs. Farrell (uncredited)
1941: One Foot in Heaven as Woman Behind Hope at Baptism (uncredited)
1941: Glamour Boy as Mr. Devin - Fruit Stand Proprietress (uncredited)
1941: Bedtime Story as Betsy
1942: Joe Smith, American as Nurse (uncredited)
1942: Lady Gangster as Deaf Annie
1942: The Gay Sisters as Nurse (uncredited)
1942: Dr. Gillespie's New Assistant as Mrs. Alberts (uncredited)
1943: So Proudly We Hail! as Lt. Irma Emerson
1943: O, My Darling Clementine as Dancer (uncredited)
1944: Since You Went Away as Nurse (uncredited)
1944: Bathing Beauty as Ms. Hanney (uncredited)
1944: Laura as Bessie Clary, Laura's Maid (uncredited)
1945: Keep Your Powder Dry as WAC Seamstress #2 (uncredited)
1945: Circumstantial Evidence as Bolger's Wife
1945: Captain Eddie as Nurse (uncredited)
1945: The Falcon in San Francisco as Hotel Maid (uncredited)
1945: Fallen Angel as Stella's Neighbor (uncredited)
1946: Miss Susie Slagle's as Mrs. Johnson
1946: Sentimental Journey as Martha (uncredited)
1946: O.S.S. as Claudette (uncredited)
1946: The Inner Circle as Emma Wilson
1946: Nocturne as Angry Apartment House Tenant (uncredited)
1946: The Best Years of Our Lives as Mrs. Cameron
1946: A Boy and His Dog (Short) as Mrs. Allen
1947: That's My Man as Millie
1947: The Trouble with Women as Henry's Mothers (uncredited)
1947: Unconquered as Woman Beside Garth Happy at Bagpipes (uncredited)
1948: The Foxes of Harrow as Mrs. Sara Fox (uncredited)
1948: Sitting Pretty as Mrs. Goul (scenes deleted)
1948: The Sainted Sisters as Widow Davitt
1948: He Walked by Night as Paranoid Housewife (uncredited)
1949: Down to the Sea in Ships as Miss Hopkins (uncredited)
1949: Not Wanted as Mrs. Aggie Kelton
1949: Samson and Delilah as Screaming Temple Spectator (uncredited)
1950: Montana as Kitty Maynard (uncredited)
1950: Paid in Full as Emily Burroughs, Nurse (uncredited)
1950: The Outriders as Farmer's Wife (uncredited)
1950: The Cariboo Trail as Nurse
1950: The Jackpot as Watch Saleswoman - Store Employee (uncredited)
1951: The First Legion as Mrs. Dunn
1951: Home Town Story as Hospital Nurse (uncredited)
1952: The Greatest Show on Earth as Sam's Wife (uncredited)
1952: Fort Osage as Mrs. Winfield
1952: Jet Job as Mrs. Kovak
1952: The Winning Team as Ma Alexander
1952: Carrie as Mrs. Meebers
1954: Rose Marie as Townswoman (uncredited)
1954: There's No Business Like Show Business as Nurse (uncredited)
1955: Many Rivers to Cross as Mrs. Crawford (uncredited)
1955: The Prodigal as Carpenter's Wife
1956: The Broken Star as Mrs. Trail (uncredited)
1956: The Man in the Gray Flannel Suit as Mrs. Hopkins' Maid (uncredited)
1956: The Killing as Ruthie O'Reilly
1956: Three for Jamie Dawn as Helen March
1956: Johnny Concho as Sarah Dark
1956: These Wilder Years as Aunt Martha
1956: The Ten Commandments as Slave woman / Hebrew at Golden Calf / Hebrew at Rameses' Gate
1956: Gunsmoke (TV Series, season 2, episode 1, "Cow Doctor") as Mrs. Pitcher
1957: Hot Rod Rumble as Ma Crawford
1957: The Buckskin Lady as Mrs. Adams
1957: An Affair to Remember as Mother at Rehearsal (uncredited)
1957: 3:10 to Yuma as Mrs. Potter (uncredited)
1958: Leave It To Beaver (TV Series) as Miss Wakeland, Acting Teacher 
1958: Gunman's Walk as Mrs. Stotheby (uncredited)
1958: The Big Country as Hannassey Woman
1958: Unwed Mother as Mrs. Paully
1960: From the Terrace as Mrs. Benziger (uncredited)
1961: The Twilight Zone (TV Series, "Dust", Season 2, episode 12) as Mrs. Canfield
1969: The Good Guys and the Bad Guys as Mrs. Pierce (uncredited)
1975: Peeper as Mrs. Prendergast

Selected Television

References

External links

 
 
 
 Dorothy Adams at Aveleyman
 

1900 births
1988 deaths
American television actresses
People from Cavalier County, North Dakota
Actresses from North Dakota
UCLA School of Theater, Film and Television faculty
20th-century American actresses
American film actresses